Sidney Harry Withington (q2 1868 – 1947) was an English footballer who played as a full back in the Football League for Walsall Town Swifts.

Withington played for Darlington in the 1889–90 FA Cup, and was a member of the team that played the club's first match in league competition, a 2–1 defeat away to Newcastle East End on 7 September 1889, the opening day of the inaugural season of the Northern League. He joined Football Alliance club Walsall Town Swifts in 1890, and two years later played in their first match in the Football League, a 2–1 defeat at home to Darwen on the opening day of the first season of the Football League Second Division. He made 20 league appearances that season, and then left to play non-league football for Cannock Town, where he remained until at least the 1896–97 season.

Notes

References

1868 births
1947 deaths
People from Cannock
English footballers
Association football fullbacks
Darlington F.C. players
Walsall F.C. players
Cannock Town F.C. players
Northern Football League players
Football Alliance players
English Football League players